Adas Israel is located in the Cleveland Park neighborhood of Washington, D.C. It is the largest Conservative synagogue in the city. President Ulysses S. Grant and acting Vice President Thomas W. Ferry attended the dedication of its first building in 1876, the first time a sitting United States President had attended a synagogue service. The original structure is the oldest surviving synagogue building in Washington, D.C., and today is known as the Lillian & Albert Small Jewish Museum.

History

Founding 
In 1869, about thirty Jewish immigrant families resigned from Washington Hebrew Congregation, the only Jewish congregation then in Washington, D.C., to form a more traditional, or Orthodox, alternative, which they called Adas Israel (lit. "Congregation of Israel"). These men and women sought a worship service more akin to the one they remembered from Europe, objecting to their former congregation's move toward Reform Judaism. For several years, they met in rented rooms and struggled to raise funds to build their own synagogue.

Most of Adas Israel's founders came from various German and Central European states. A minority—around a fourth—came from Poland or other parts of the Russian Empire. Most listed their occupations as merchants and lived above or near their shops. Many families had more than four children. Most members of the congregation had lived in the nation's capital for more than ten years by the time the synagogue was dedicated.

Roughly 35 families began the congregation. Some of their descendants attend Adas Israel today.

Affiliation 

For the Jewish community, Adas Israel was a center of traditional worship. Its constitution affirmed the Orthodox religious practices to which members were committed and forbade religious reforms from ever being made. Prayers were read in Hebrew, with the exception of the prayer for the government, which could be recited in English after being read in Hebrew. A minyan took place daily.

As time went on services began to change from the original forms. English was introduced into the services, at first to translate prayers. In the late 1920s, Adas Israel affiliated with the Conservative movement, and has remained a Conservative congregation since. Initially, Adas Israel followed Orthodox tradition with separate seating for men and women, but discontinued the practice in 1951.

Today, Adas Israel “aspires to perpetuate Judaism, to enrich the lives of our members to celebrate Conservative Judaism at its creative best, and to bring Jews closer to God.” Adas Israel is a congregation focused on social consciousness and Jewish activism, sponsoring many community service projects. The congregation also provides many different means of being involved with Judaism. On Shabbat, as many as seven different services are held. These include traditional services, Havurah, an egalitarian minyan, potlucks for young professionals, and the Ruach Minyan.

Role in the city 

Adas Israel has played an important role in the nation's capital from its founding.
 
President Ulysses S. Grant and the President Pro Tempore of the Senate, Thomas White Ferry, attended the three-hour Orthodox dedication service on June 9, 1876. This was the first time a sitting U.S. president had attended a synagogue service.

Local newspapers frequently reported on synagogue services and other communal events. Bat and Bar mitzvot, weddings, the High Holidays, Purim plays, and Passover celebrations all occasioned public notice.

When President William McKinley was shot and killed by an assassin in Buffalo in 1901, the congregation convened a special service in his memory.

In 1963 Adas Israel was the first synagogue to be addressed by civil rights leader Dr. Martin Luther King Jr.

President Lyndon Johnson attended a Thanksgiving Day service following the assassination of his predecessor, John F. Kennedy, in 1963. This interfaith service included a sermon by Rabbi Stanley Rabinowitz. That night, Johnson paraphrased Rabinowitz's words in a nationally televised address, speaking of how blessings can come from evil situations.

Following Yitzhak Rabin’s assassination in 1995, Vice President Al Gore and members of the Cabinet and Supreme Court attended a memorial service at Adas Israel.

Other notable speakers at Adas Israel have included Presidents Richard Nixon and Gerald Ford, Vice President Hubert Humphrey, Israeli Prime Ministers Golda Meir and Yitzhak Rabin, Senator Robert F. Kennedy. and President Barack Obama.

Buildings

First building (1876–1908) 

After years of planning and fundraising, the congregation completed and dedicated its first synagogue building just in time for the nation's Centennial celebration—providing a strong and symbolic presence for Jewish immigrants. The synagogue stood at the corner of 6th and G Streets, NW, in the heart of the city's residential and commercial center, where many of the congregants lived and worked.

An influx of immigrants from Eastern Europe and Russia swelled the congregation's numbers. The congregation continued in the original synagogue until 1908, when a new building at Sixth and I Streets, NW, was dedicated. The original building was sold to Stephen Gatti, an Italian fruit dealer and real estate investor who lived a block away. In the 1910s, Saint Sophia's Greek Orthodox Church worshipped in the second-floor sanctuary. A succession of churches followed in the 1920s to 1940s. During the course of the next 60 years, the former synagogue's first floor was divided into retail spaces and housed a bicycle shop, barber, Joseph Funger's grocery store, Anthony Litteri's delicatessen, and other businesses.

In the 1960s, plans for the construction of Metro headquarters threatened the building with demolition. With the support of federal and city agencies, the Jewish Historical Society of Greater Washington saved the building and moved it three city blocks to Third and G Streets, NW. On September 1, 1969, President Richard Nixon signed a law authorizing the District to purchase the building and lease it to the Society for historic preservation purposes—at $1 a year for 99 years.

The historic synagogue building was restored by the Jewish Historical Society of Greater Washington and became the home to the Lillian & Albert Small Jewish Museum.

The synagogue building is Washington's oldest surviving synagogue building. It is listed on the National Register of Historic Places, the D.C. Inventory of Historic Sites, and the Historic American Buildings Survey. It is among the oldest synagogue buildings still standing in the United States. It is also an official project of the Save America's Treasures program.

In 2016, the building was moved 60 feet; in January 2019 it was moved again, one block down G Street Northwest, to F Street Northwest to a location where it will become part of a much larger Capital Jewish Museum.

Second building (1908–51) 

After outgrowing its original building at Sixth and G Streets, NW, the congregation constructed a new structure at Sixth and I Streets, NW.

The cornerstone was laid in 1906. Architect Louis Levi of Baltimore designed the building in the Moorish style that was popular for synagogue architecture at the time. The building was dedicated on January 5, 1908. While at Sixth and I, the congregation grew vastly. Consequently, in 1943 the congregation purchased land for a new building on Connecticut Avenue, NW, outside the city's center core.

In 1951, the congregation moved to its current location at Connecticut Avenue and Porter Street, NW. The Sixth and I building was purchased and occupied by the Turner Memorial African Methodist Episcopal Church. In 2002, when Turner moved to Hyattsville, Maryland, and offered the building for sale, Laura Cohen Apelbaum, current director of the Jewish Historical Society of Greater Washington, appealed to the Jewish community to save the building. Three real estate developers, Shelton Zuckerman, Abe Pollin, and Douglas Jemal, placed a winning bid of $5 million on the property.

Today, the former Adas Israel building is known as the Sixth and I Historic Synagogue and serves as a hub of religious and cultural Jewish life for young professionals in Washington. The space also hosts many popular book talks and concerts by locally and nationally recognized authors and performers each year.

Current building (1951–present) 

In the 1930s and 1940s, Adas Israel's members began to move uptown. The congregation initially intended to purchase land at Connecticut Avenue and Ellicott Street, NW. When that site was deemed too small, a larger triangular site at Connecticut and Porter Street, NW, was found and determined to be suitable.

The congregation, led by longtime President Joseph Wilner, built a large new facility at Connecticut Avenue and Quebec Street, NW, in the Cleveland Park neighborhood, in 1951. Architects Frank Grad and Sons designed the building in a style favored by many synagogues built after the Second World War: clean lines, large scale, and bright interiors. The cornerstone for the new building was laid in 1950; the building was dedicated later that year.

The new Adas Israel, which cost nearly $1.3 million, included a 300-seat chapel, two social auditoriums, 14 classrooms and a 1,500-seat sanctuary with a balcony, a hidden choir loft, an organ, an Ark framed in black onyx and marble, and five heavy bronze doors which opened onto a lobby decorated in red marble that led to a large, open plaza overlooking the intersection. A large engraved menorah—chosen as a symbol of Judaism after much debate within the congregation—graces the façade facing the plaza.
 
Morris Gewirz, for whom one of the building's auditoriums was named (the other was named for his site commission co-chair Abraham Kay), declared, “This great edifice stands like a mighty colossus of spiritual strength.”

The school wing and auditoriums were added in 1958. Adas Israel further renovated and expanded the building in 1988. It rededicated the building in 1990, with a speech by former Israeli Ambassador Abba Eban.

The building underwent major renovations in 2013.

People

Notable clergy and staff 

For the congregation's first several years, paid hazzanim (cantors) and volunteers from within the congregation met worship needs. This practice was in keeping with the Jewish tradition of forming congregations and often conducting worship without religious functionaries.

The first cantor, Joseph A. Cohen, served briefly in 1872–73. Adas Israel's second cantor, Jacob Voorsanger, attended the Jewish Theological Seminary in Amsterdam before immigrating to the United States in 1873. Voorsanger, who served from 1876 to 1877, left Adas Israel after only one year. He later gained fame as the rabbi of San Francisco's leading Reform congregation, Temple Emanu-El.

During the early years, the congregation asked clergy to fill multiple duties, including as teachers and even as shochets (ritual butcher). One shochet aroused criticism for teaching classes in his bloody clothing.

In 1898, Adas Israel hired Morris Mandel, who had been in the third graduating class of the Jewish Theological Seminary, as its first rabbi. He became Adas Israel's first clergyman trained in the United States. Many members objected to his hiring, and generally to having a rabbi, as shown in this excerpt from the congregation minutes of August 23, 1898: “Mr. Lewis wished to know what functions Mr. Mandel was to perform, whether Rabbi or Teacher? The President answered that he was Rabbi and teacher both. Mr. M. Roginsky and Mr. Isaac Levy . . . objected to having a rabbi.”

Rabbi Julius Loeb served the congregation from 1901 to 1906. Ordained in 1889 at the Yeshiva in Brisk (Brest-Litovsk), Russia, he immigrated to the United States in 1890. In response to the changing congregation, which had many members newly arrived from Eastern Europe who did not speak English, he delivered sermons in Yiddish.

The first three decades of the 20th century saw a multitude of rabbis, some remaining with the congregation for under a year. Adas Israel hired clergy for one-year terms until the 1940s. Lithuanian-born Solomon Metz took over as rabbi in 1930 and remained until 1951—becoming Adas Israel's first long-term rabbi.
 
Louis Novick was cantor from 1923 to 1946, followed by  Jacob Barkin from 1946 to 1958. Barkin performed in many concerts, secular and religious, appearing with the National Symphony Orchestra many times. While at Adas Israel, he received an offer to join the Metropolitan Opera, but he turned it down so he could continue being a cantor.

In 1951, Baltimore-born Rabbi David Panitz replaced Metz. He departed in 1959, serving Temple Emanuel in Paterson, New Jersey, until 1988.

In 1960, Rabbi Stanley Rabinowitz was hired from Minneapolis, and remained the senior rabbi for 26 years, also serving as president of the Rabbinical Assembly (a national organization of Conservative Jewish rabbis). Cantor Arnold Saltzman (now a rabbi) served the congregation for 24 years, beginning in the early 1980s. Rabbi Jeffrey Wohlberg succeeded Rabinowitz following his retirement in 1986. Like Rabinowitz, Wohlberg served as president of the Rabbinical Assembly. Under his leadership, the congregation created the Garden of the Righteous program to honor righteous Gentiles who rescued Jews during the Holocaust.  Today Rabbis Holtzblatt and Alexander serve as the congregation's senior rabbis. 

Adas Israel is the only synagogue that has ever had three national presidents of the North American Association of Synagogue Executives (NAASE): Abe Shefferman, Sandy Cohen, and Glenn Easton.

Congregants 

During the late 1800s and early 1900s, many Eastern European Jews arrived in Washington and joined Adas Israel. Meanwhile, Yiddish replaced German and English as the language recorded in the congregation's board minutes. So many new congregants joined that Adas Israel outgrew its first building and relocated in 1908.

Arthur Welsh, the United States' first Jewish aviator and an employee of the Wright brothers, was married at Adas Israel in 1907. Welsh is buried in Adas Israel's cemetery in Southeast Washington.

In 1912, the congregation listed 186 members (families) on its rolls. By 1934 the congregation's membership rolls had grown to 354, and expanded further two years later to around 400, then 480 in 1938, 512 in 1939, 530 in 1940, 607 in 1944, and 777 in 1948. This rapid growth reflected the influx of Jews into Washington to work for the federal government during the New Deal, World War II, and beyond.

A 1940 membership survey found that 85 percent of the congregants lived above U Street, NW, and west of 16th Street, NW. This finding resulted in the congregation moving to its current building in Cleveland Park.

From the time Congressman Sol Bloom joined in 1926, Adas Israel has had its share of prominent congregants. Many members of Congress, Cabinet officials, and federal employees have been members of Adas Israel. Israeli Ambassador Yitzhak Rabin and his wife Leah worshiped at Adas Israel during his tenure as ambassador to the United States. So have many of their successors.

A membership survey in 1965 revealed that Adas Israel had 1,132 families with 478 children enrolled in its school. Many of the Washington area's prominent Jews were among the synagogue's members. That remains true today, as does Adas Israel's status as the capital city's largest Conservative congregation. Today Adas Israel has 1,450 households as members, with 350 children enrolled in the religious school and 200 in the nursery school.

Affinity groups and institutions

Cemetery 
Adas Israel established a cemetery at 1400 Alabama Avenue, SE, in 1869, the year of the congregation's founding. Among the notable burials in the cemetery are Arthur Welsh, the country's first Jewish aviator; Stephen Theodore Norman, the grandson of Theodor Herzl; and the noted neoconservative commentator Irving Kristol.

Religious school 
By 1872, before the synagogue was built, the young Adas Israel Congregation held religious classes for boys and girls for two hours in the afternoon, several times a week. Members typically paid $1.00 a month for each child's tuition.

During the early years, the congregation had difficulty maintaining a school. By 1925, though, 227 students were enrolled in the school. That number grew to 320 by 1939. Because of space concerns, the school had to meet outside the synagogue, including at the Jewish Community Center on 16th Street, NW. The entire school first met in one place when Adas Israel built its Cleveland Park synagogue in 1951. The congregation held its first Bat Mitzvah in 1962. In 1973 the Congregation began the short-lived Tel Shalom summer camp in West Virginia for fourth to tenth graders.

Adas Israel today also runs Gan HaYeled, a nursery school for children younger than five years old. The Melvin Gelman Religious School teaches students in grades K-12, with Ma'a lot DC allowing teenagers to continue studying following their bar and bat mitzvahs.

Sisterhood 
The Adas Israel Ladies’ Auxiliary organized officially in 1898 and elected Julia Oppenheimer, wife of congregation president Simon Oppenheimer, as its first president. Newspaper articles provide accounts of Sisterhood activities—from lectures and music performances to strawberry fairs and picnics that raised money for the congregation.

Today the organization is known as the Sisterhood. Members of the Sisterhood have long played a major role in the National Women's League.

Brotherhood/Men’s Club 
Adas Israel's Brotherhood first formed in 1941, with Irvin Goldstein serving as its first president. It later took the name Men's Club, which it holds today. Three Adas Israel members, Max Goldberg, Jacob Lish, and Mark Berlin, have served as national Men's Club presidents.

Other groups 
Adas Israel held its first Havurah (self-led) service in 1972, the first at any Conservative Jewish congregation. It also held its first self-led study group that year. Since then, Adas Israel has had a wide variety of lay-led groups, including the egalitarian minyan, Ruach Minyan, and groups for young professionals and senior citizens.

See also 

List of synagogues in the United States
Judaism in the United States

References

External links

 
 
 

Cleveland Park
Synagogues in Washington, D.C.
Conservative synagogues in the United States
Synagogues preserved as museums
History of Washington, D.C.
Religious organizations established in 1876
1876 establishments in Washington, D.C.
Synagogues completed in 1876
1951 establishments in Washington, D.C.
Synagogues completed in 1951
1950s architecture in the United States
Streamline Moderne architecture in the United States
Art Deco synagogues